The Barcău or Bereteu (Romanian or Berettyó in Hungarian) is a river which has its origin in Sălaj County, Romania. After crossing Bihor County in Romania and Hajdú-Bihar and Békés County in Hungary, it flows into the Sebes-Körös (Romanian: Crișul Repede) near Szeghalom.

The upper reach of the Barcău, upstream of the junction with the Răchita is locally called the Ștei, Berchesei or Bărcașu. The reach between the junctions with the Răchita and the Toplița is locally known as the Tusa. The name Barcău is only used following its confluence with the Toplița.

Towns and villages

The following towns and villages are situated along the river Barcău, from source to mouth: in Romania: Valcău de Jos, Boghiș, Nușfalău, Ip, Suplacu de Barcău, Balc, Abram, Marghita, Abrămuț, Chișlaz, Sălard, Tămășeu, in Hungary Kismarja, Pocsaj, Gáborján, Berettyóújfalu, Szeghalom.

Tributaries

The following rivers are tributaries to the river Barcău (from source to mouth):

Left: Valea Răchitelor, Toplița, Iaz, Valea Mare, Groapa, Cerăsei, Marca, Borumlaca, Săldăbagiu, Bistra, Valea Albă, Tria, Valea Fânețelor, Almaș, Valea Vițeilor, Fâneața Mare, Crișul Mic
Right: Comăneasa, Ip, Camăr, Curătura, Dijir, Inot, Cheț, Valea Lacului, Făncica, Sânnicolau, Roșiori, Ier

References

Rivers of Romania
Rivers of Hungary
Rivers of Bihor County
Rivers of Sălaj County
 
International rivers of Europe